Neufchâtel-en-Saosnois is a commune in the Sarthe department in the region of Pays de la Loire in north-western France.

The ruins of the Cistercian Perseigne Abbey, a monument historique, are located in the commune.

See also
Communes of the Sarthe department
Parc naturel régional Normandie-Maine

References

External links

 Information about the former abbey (in French)

Communes of Sarthe